Ma Chul-jun (born 16 November 1980) is a South Korean former footballer and manager.

Career statistics

External links

1980 births
Living people
Association football defenders
South Korean footballers
Goyang Zaicro FC players
Jeju United FC players
Gimcheon Sangmu FC players
Jeonbuk Hyundai Motors players
Gwangju FC players
Korea National League players
K League 1 players
K League 2 players